The following list is of important municipalities in the Valencian Community, an autonomous community of Spain:

Provincial lists 
The following links are to lists which are more detailed province-specific, and all municipalities in a given province are ranked by population.

 List of municipalities in Alicante
 List of municipalities in Castellón
 List of municipalities in Valencia

By population

See also 

 Comarques of the Valencian Community

References